ERO1-like protein alpha is a protein that in humans is encoded by the ERO1L gene.

Interactions 

ERO1L has been shown to interact with TXNDC4 and P4HB.

References

Further reading